Hasley Canyon is a census-designated place in the Sierra Pelona mountains of Los Angeles County, California. The 2010 United States census reported Hasley Canyon's population was 1,137.

Geography
According to the United States Census Bureau, the CDP has a total area of 5.7 square miles (14.9 km), over 99% of which is land.

Demographics

At the 2010 census Hasley Canyon had a population of 1,137. The racial makeup of Hasley Canyon was 966 (85.0%) White (72.6% Non-Hispanic White), 15 (1.3%) African American, 2 (0.2%) Native American, 26 (2.3%) Asian, 1 (0.1%) Pacific Islander, 75 (6.6%) from other races, and 52 (4.6%) from two or more races. Hispanic or Latino of any race were 244 people (21.5%).

The whole population lived in households, no one lived in non-institutionalized group quarters and no one was institutionalized.

There were 383 households, 149 (38.9%) had children under the age of 18 living in them, 263 (68.7%) were opposite-sex married couples living together, 23 (6.0%) had a female householder with no husband present, 22 (5.7%) had a male householder with no wife present.  There were 10 (2.6%) unmarried opposite-sex partnerships, and 1 (0.3%) same-sex married couples or partnerships. 59 households (15.4%) were one person and 19 (5.0%) had someone living alone who was 65 or older. The average household size was 2.97.  There were 308 families (80.4% of households); the average family size was 3.32.

The age distribution was 283 people (24.9%) under the age of 18, 95 people (8.4%) aged 18 to 24, 236 people (20.8%) aged 25 to 44, 401 people (35.3%) aged 45 to 64, and 122 people (10.7%) who were 65 or older.  The median age was 43.0 years. For every 100 females, there were 112.5 males.  For every 100 females age 18 and over, there were 108.8 males.

There were 406 housing units at an average density of 70.7 per square mile, of the occupied units 348 (90.9%) were owner-occupied and 35 (9.1%) were rented. The homeowner vacancy rate was 2.0%; the rental vacancy rate was 7.7%.  1,061 people (93.3% of the population) lived in owner-occupied housing units and 76 people (6.7%) lived in rental housing units.

According to the 2010 United States Census, Hasley Canyon had a median household income of $93,675, with 10.4% of the population living below the federal poverty line.

References

Census-designated places in Los Angeles County, California
Census-designated places in California